Matrimonial websites, or marriage websites, are a variation of the standard dating websites.

Matrimonial sites are popular in India and among Indians settled overseas, as an alternative to the traditional marriage broker. According to the Associated Chambers of Commerce and Industry in India, the online matrimony business is expected to be a $250 Million business by 2017. According to The New York Times, there are over 1500 matrimony websites in India.

Matrimonial sites register users, after which they are able to upload their profile onto a searchable database maintained by the website. Those users looking to find suitors search the database with customised searches that typically include nationality, age, gender, availability of photograph and often religion, geographic location and caste (mainly for websites based in India).

There have been reports of abuse of information obtained from matrimonial websites.

See also
Arranged marriage
Matchmaking
Online dating service

References

Further reading 
 
 
 
 

Matchmaking
Matrimonial websites